The 1972–73 Regionalliga  was the tenth season of the Regionalliga, the second tier of the German football league system. The league operated in five regional divisions, Berlin, North, South, Southwest and West. The five league champions and all five runners-up, at the end of the season, entered a promotion play-off to determine the two clubs to move up to the Bundesliga for the next season. Both promotion spots went to the Regionalliga West with Rot-Weiß Essen and Fortuna Köln promoted.

Regionalliga Nord
The 1972–73 season saw two new clubs in the league, VfB Oldenburg and SV Meppen, both promoted from the Amateurliga, while no club had been relegated from the Bundesliga to the league.

Regionalliga Berlin
The 1972–73 season saw two new clubs in the league, BFC Preussen and Rot-Weiß Neukölln, both promoted from the Amateurliga Berlin, while no club had been relegated from the Bundesliga to the league. The league played a home-and-away round, after which it was split into a championship and relegation round. Former Bundesliga club Tasmania 1900 Berlin became insolvent at the end of the 1972–73 season and folded.

Regionalliga West
The 1972–73 season saw four new clubs in the league, 1. FC Mülheim and Sportfreunde Siegen, both promoted from the Verbandsliga, while Arminia Bielefeld, as part of the Bundesliga scandal, and Borussia Dortmund had been relegated from the Bundesliga to the league. Eintracht Gelsenkirchen merged at the end of the 1972–73 season with STV Horst-Emscher to form Eintracht Gelsenkirchen-Horst.

Regionalliga Südwest
The 1972–73 season saw two new clubs in the league, VfB Theley and Sportfreunde Eisbachtal, both promoted from the Amateurliga, while no club had been relegated from the Bundesliga to the league.

Regionalliga Süd
The 1972–73 season saw three new clubs in the league, SV Waldhof Mannheim, VfR Oli Bürstadt and FC Wacker München, all three promoted from the Amateurliga, while no club had been relegated from the Bundesliga to the league.

Bundesliga promotion round

Group 1

Group 2

References

Sources
 30 Jahre Bundesliga  30th anniversary special, publisher: kicker Sportmagazin, published: 1993
 kicker-Almanach 1990  Yearbook of German football, publisher: kicker Sportmagazin, published: 1989, 
 DSFS Liga-Chronik seit 1945  publisher: DSFS, published: 2005

External links
Regionalliga on the official DFB website 
kicker 
Das Deutsche Fussball Archiv  Historic German league tables

1972-73
2
Ger